The position of Poet Laureate of Virginia was established December 18, 1936 by the Virginia General Assembly.

Originally, the Poet Laureate of Virginia was appointed without outside consultation by the General Assembly, usually for one year, in a process that has been described being "more of a political thing".

As of 1996, the procedure was changed and most recently codified in 1998 in Virginia Code, Sec. 7.1–43, as follows:

7.1-43. Poet laureate.
The honorary position of Poet Laureate of Virginia is hereby created. Beginning in 1998, the Governor may appoint a poet laureate from a list of nominees submitted by the Poetry Society of Virginia. Each poet laureate shall serve a term of two years with no restrictions on reappointment.
(1997, c. 299.)

The Virginia General Assembly now confirms the governor's appointment.

As of 2020, the current Poet Laureate of Virginia is Luisa Igloria.

List of Poets Laureate of Virginia

Current Poet Laureate:
Luisa Igloria (July 1, 2020 - June 30, 2022)

Former Poets Laureate:
Henry Hart (July 1, 2018 – June 30, 2020)
Tim Seibles (July 1, 2016 – June 30, 2018)
Ron Smith (July 1, 2014 – June 30, 2016)
Sofia Starnes (July 1, 2012 – June 30, 2014)
Kelly Cherry (July 1, 2010 – June 30, 2012)
Claudia Emerson (August 26, 2008 – June 30, 2010)
Carolyn Kreiter-Foronda (June 26, 2006 – June 30, 2008)
Rita Dove (September 20, 2004 – June 25, 2006)
George Garrett (July 9, 2002 – June 30, 2004)
Grace Pow Simpson (2000–2002)
Joseph Awad (1998–2000)
Margaret Ward Morland (1996–1998)
Kathryn Forrester Thro (July 1, 1994 – June 30, 1996)
Guy Carleton Drewry (1970–1991)
Ruby Altizer Roberts (1950; poet laureate emerita, 1992)
Leigh Buckner Hanes (1949)
Thomas Lomax Hunter (1948)
Charles Day (1942–1948)
Carter Warner Wormeley (1936–1938)

See also
 Virginia literature

References

External links

Poet Laureate of Virginia from the Library of Congress
  Welcome to Poet Laureate of Virginia Information Page (archived from The Poetry Society of Virginia website)

Virginia culture
 
1936 establishments in Virginia
American Poets Laureate